Edward Stanley Watsford (28 January 1874 – 21 August 1927) was an Australian rules footballer who played with Collingwood in the Victorian Football League (VFL).

He was the brother of Doug Watsford who also played for Collingwood.

Notes

External links 

		
Stan Watsford's profile at Collingwood Forever

1874 births
1927 deaths
Australian rules footballers from Victoria (Australia)
Collingwood Football Club players
Australian rules footballers from Albury